Janasadharan is an Indian Assamese language daily newspaper. It began publication in 2003.  the chief editor of this daily was Dr. Sivanath Barman, a retired physics professor and an Assamese scholar. The headquarters is at Guwahati, Assam. It is published simultaneously from Guwahati and Dibrugarh.

See also 
 Dainik Janambhumi
 Niyomiya Barta
 Assam Talks

References

External links 

Assamese-language newspapers
Publications established in 2003
Mass media in Guwahati
2003 establishments in Assam